Adriano Adriano Antunes de Paula (born 13 June 1987), simply known as Adriano Pardal, is a Brazilian professional footballer playing for Hajer.

References

External links
 

1987 births
Living people
Association football forwards
Brazilian footballers
Esporte Clube Vitória players
Juazeiro Social Clube players
Botafogo Futebol Clube (SP) players
Sociedade Esportiva e Recreativa Caxias do Sul players
ABC Futebol Clube players
Daegu FC players
Ceará Sporting Club players
América Futebol Clube (RN) players
Al-Faisaly FC players
Hajer FC players
Campeonato Brasileiro Série A players
Campeonato Brasileiro Série B players
K League 1 players
Saudi Professional League players
Saudi Second Division players
Saudi First Division League players
Expatriate footballers in Saudi Arabia
Brazilian expatriate sportspeople in Saudi Arabia